The Theme of Thessalonica was a military-civilian province (thema or theme) of the Byzantine Empire located in the southern Balkans, comprising varying parts of Central and Western Macedonia and centred on Thessalonica, the Empire's second-most important city.

History
In Late Antiquity, Thessalonica was the capital of the Roman province of Macedonia and of the Diocese of Macedonia, and the seat of the praetorian prefect of Illyricum. With the loss of most of the Balkan hinterland to the Slavic and Bulgar invasions in the 7th century, however, the authority of the prefect (in Greek eparchos, "eparch") was largely confined to the city and its immediate surroundings. The eparch continued to govern Thessalonica until the early 9th century, when he was replaced by a strategos at the head of the new theme of Thessalonica.

The strategos of Thessalonica is attested for the first time in 836, but a letter of Emperor Michael II to the Frankish king Louis the Pious may indicate the theme's existence already in 824. The historian Warren Treadgold dates the theme's creation to c. 809, during the anti-Bulgarian campaigns of Emperor Nikephoros I which extended Byzantine rule to the city's hinterland. Treadgold further conjectures that its troops in the 9th century numbered about 2,000 men. To the east, the theme extended to the river Strymon and the theme of the same name. To the south, it bounded the theme of Hellas, somewhere in northern Thessaly. Its western and northern bounds were undetermined, fluctuating with the tide of war between the Byzantines, the local Slavic tribes, and the Bulgarians.

Under Emperor John I Tzimiskes, a doux who commanded the professional tagmatic troops stationed in the theme was installed in the city, and seems to have co-existed for a while with the strategos, before assuming the latter's duties as well. In the 11th century, the doukaton of Thessalonica was of such importance that it was often held by members of the imperial family. The city and most of Macedonia were captured by Latins after the Fourth Crusade, and became part of the Kingdom of Thessalonica, which survived until 1224, when it was captured by Epirus. The theme was reconstituted after the city and most of Macedonia fell into the hands of the Empire of Nicaea in 1246, and survived until captured by the Ottoman Turks in 1392; by that time, however, the theme was essentially reduced to the city itself. Regained by Byzantium in 1402, the city became the seat of a despotate, until it was surrendered to Venice in 1423, during another siege by the Ottomans which ended with the city's conquest in 1430.

References

Sources

 

Themes of the Byzantine Empire
Medieval Macedonia
Medieval Thessalonica
Byzantine provinces in Macedonia